Colony Farm Regional Park is a park along the Coquitlam River in the Tri-Cities area of Metro Vancouver. It is 260 hectares in size. Colony Farm was once one of the most modern and productive working farms in Canada. Today, it provides important habitat for many animal species and over 200 bird species.

References

Parks in Coquitlam
Port Coquitlam